"Young Wheezy" is a song by Canadian rapper Nav and American rapper Gunna, from the former's mixtape Emergency Tsunami (2020). Its music video was released on January 7, 2021, and the song was sent to U.S. rhythmic contemporary radio five days later. Produced by Wheezy, the song's namesake, the song is about the rappers' lifestyles.

Music video
The music video, directed by Spike Jordan, has a Halloween theme and plays on the lyrics "Cost an arm and a leg just to see me perform". The video begins with a long line of people waiting at a venue, where Nav and Gunna and Travis Scott are hosting a party, with dismembered limbs as their required tickets to enter. A group of teens talk about how they obtained the limbs, indicating how eager they were to go. Inside the house, Nav and Gunna are seen performing, while "spooky visual effects" are also taking place. A "hefty collection" of the severed limbs are shown at one point. Travis Scott makes a cameo, seen with the collaborators as they surround an open grave. Wheezy also appears in the video; he later dissolves into water in the middle of a laundromat.

Live performances
Nav and Gunna performed the song on Jimmy Kimmel Live! in February 2021.

Charts

References

2020 songs
2021 singles
Nav (rapper) songs
Gunna (rapper) songs
Republic Records singles
Song recordings produced by Wheezy (record producer)
Songs written by Nav (rapper)
Songs written by Gunna (rapper)
Songs written by Wheezy (record producer)
Songs written by Amir Esmailian